Sangarapillai Sivathasan (21 August 1934 – 12 November 2011) was a Sri Lankan political activist.

Sivathasan was born as second child to Sangarapillai and Sellamuthu in Kollankaladdy near Tellippalai. He studied in Kandy and was very versed in many languages. He joined the Ceylon Communist Party in 1950s and worked closely with Pieter Keuneman, Premalal Kumarasiri and Douglas Devananda's father S. Kathiravelu. He was one of the key member for the formation of the Ceylon Communist Party (Maoist) in 1963. Later he married his comrade Kathiravelu's sister. 

In 1986 he was detained by LTTE for his association with EPRLF. In1987 after the Indo-Sri Lanka Accord, he became a Provincial Council Member in the joined North-East Provincial Council. He was a Member of Parliament twice, representing Jaffna district. He was injured in a bomb blast carried out by the LTTE in August 2006 targeting his vehicle in Colombo and survived by a hair's breadth while being the Chairman of the Palmyrah Development Board.

References

1934 births
2011 deaths
Eelam People's Democratic Party politicians
Members of the 10th Parliament of Sri Lanka
Sri Lankan communists
Sri Lankan Tamil politicians
People from British Ceylon